Zoka Forest is a natural tropical rain forest in the Northern Region of Uganda. The forest is a component of the larger East Moyo Wildlife Reserve.

Location
The coordinates of the forest are 03°01'03.0"N, 31°39'21.0"E (Latitude:3.017500; Longitude:31.655830).

Overview
It is the only natural tropical rain forest and the only natural forest resource in Adjumani District.

Conflicting interests

Prime minister's investigation
In August 2016, Prime Minister Ruhakana Rugunda launched an investigation into the plundering of the Zika Forest. The four-person team is led by Mary Karooro Okurut, the Minister for General Duties in the Office of the Prime Minister. Other team members include Lands, Housing and Urban Development Minister Betty Amongi, Minister of Water and Environment Sam Cheptoris, and Minister of State for Northern Uganda Grace Kwiyucwiny.

UPDF vs NFA
The National Forestry Authority (NFA) has in the past accused members of the Uganda People's Defence Force (UPDF) of illegally felling trees in the forest reserve and using UPDF trucks to transport the logs out of the forest. In October 2016, the resident commissioner of the Ajumani District told a press conference that she had photographs of UPDF trucks doing this. The trucks were followed to the Pabbo Army Detach in Amuru District, which is under the command of the 4th Division of the UPDF, headquartered in Gulu. The UPDF has mounted an investigation led by the 4th Division Commander, Brigadier Kayanja Muhanga.

Cabinet ministers disagree
On 4 October 2016, State Minister of Lands Persis Namuganza called a press conference to announce plans to de-gazette part of the Zoka Forest to allow the Madhvani Group to grow sugarcane in the area and relieve the contract farmers in the Busoga sub-region. The contract farmers in Busoga are starving because they neglected to grow food for their own sustenance and instead planted sugarcane.

The plan evoked immediate outrage from environmental groups, Friends of ZOKA, headed by William Leslie Amanzuru a dedicated environmentalist, the NFA, politicians, and concerned citizens. Deputy Prime Minister Moses Ali, a member of parliament from the Adjumani District, called an impromptu meeting in which Minister of Lands, Housing and Urban Development Betty Amongi disowned the plan announced by Namuganza, her junior minister.

See also
 Central Forest Reserves of Uganda

References

Tropical and subtropical moist broadleaf forests
Forests of Uganda
Adjumani District
Northern Region, Uganda